Lost Angels (also known as The Road Home) is a 1989 independent film directed by Hugh Hudson and written by Michael Weller. It stars Donald Sutherland and Adam Horovitz. It was filmed in and around San Antonio, Texas. The film was entered into the 1989 Cannes Film Festival.

Plot
Tim Doolan (Horovitz), a troubled youth from a broken home in Los Angeles, is sent to a private psychiatric hospital after an altercation with the police turns violent. In the hospital, he makes a connection with Dr. Charles Loftis (Sutherland), a man with issues of his own.

Cast 

Donald Sutherland as Dr. Charles Loftis
Adam Horovitz as Tim "Chino" Doolan
Amy Locane as Cheryl Anderson
Don Bloomfield as Andy "Natas" Doolan
Celia Weston as Felicia Doolan Marks
Graham Beckel as Richard Doolan
Patricia Richardson as Mrs. Anderson
Ron Frazier as Barton Marks
Joe D'Angerio as Sweeney
William O'Leary as Link
Kevin Corrigan as Gata
Gary Riley as Spooky
Michael Cunningham as D.A.B. Kid
Leonard Porter Salazar as Paco
Jonathan Del Arco as Angel
Celia Newman as Paco's Girl "Maria"
David Herman as Carlo
Max Perlich as Frankie
Nina Siemaszko as Merilee
Kevin Tighe as Dr. Gaeyl
John C. McGinley as Dr. Farmer
Frances Fisher as Judith Loftis
Lee Wilkof as Ted Bingham
James N. Harrell as Shelby
Jack Gold as Judge
Keone Young as Atty. Victor Eng
Park Overall as Richard Doolan's Girlfriend
Pauly Shore as Kid #3

References

External links
Lost Angels at the Internet Movie Database
Lost Angels at Rotten Tomatoes

Orion Pictures films
1989 films
1989 independent films
1980s teen drama films
American teen drama films
Films set in psychiatric hospitals
Films set in Los Angeles
Films shot in San Antonio
Films directed by Hugh Hudson
Films scored by Philippe Sarde
1989 drama films
1980s English-language films
1980s American films